Mystery Chronicle: One Way Heroics is a role-playing video game developed by Spike Chunsoft for the PlayStation 4 and PlayStation Vita, released in Japan on July 30, 2015. It is a spin-off of the Mystery Dungeon series, and is based on the indie game One Way Heroics.

Gameplay 
Like previous Mystery Dungeon titles, Fushigi no Chronicle is a turn-based role-playing game in which players explore randomly-generated dungeons. However, with every turn that passes, the screen will scroll as the game world slowly gets swallowed up by a light.

Development 
The game's producers, Yuichiro Saito and Yoshinori Terasawa, found out about the game One Way Heroics at the Japanese indie game developer gathering ; they were intrigued by the idea of combining roguelike gameplay with forced scrolling, and found the game fun to play. At first they considered porting the game to consoles, but as the original version of the game was available to play for free, they instead thought of ways to expand and improve on it; eventually they asked the developer of One Way Heroics for permission to develop a new game from scratch, with One Way Heroics as the foundation.

The game was released for PlayStation 4 and PlayStation Vita by Spike Chunsoft on July 30, 2015 in Japan. To promote it, character classes based on the Spike Chunsoft game series Danganronpa and Shiren the Wanderer were included in the game.

Limited Run Games released physical editions of the PlayStation 4 and PlayStation Vita versions in the West in September 2016, limited to 5,000 copies for each of the platforms.

Reception 

The game was met by "mixed or average" reviews according to the review aggregator Metacritic.

Notes

References

External links 
 Official Japanese website 

2015 video games
Japan-exclusive video games
Spike Chunsoft video games
Role-playing video games
PlayStation 4 games
PlayStation Vita games
Video games developed in Japan
Windows games
Mystery Dungeon